The Caraballo Mountains loam-swimming skink (Brachymeles muntingkamay) is a species of skink endemic to the Philippines.

References

Reptiles of the Philippines
Reptiles described in 2009
Brachymeles
Endemic fauna of the Philippines